Sakato may refer to:

 George T. Sakato (1921–2015), American soldier who received the Medal of Honor
 Sacato, East Timor, a village in the exclave of Oecusse, East Timor